Su Li-wen (born 13 December 1980) is a Taiwanese taekwondo practitioner. She won gold medals for the lightweight (63 kg) category at the 2006 Asian Games in Doha, Qatar, and at the 2007 Summer Universiade in Bangkok, Thailand.

Su represented Chinese Taipei at the 2008 Summer Olympics in Beijing, where she competed and played for the women's 57 kg category. She aggravated a left knee injury in her first round defeat to South Korea's Lim Su-Jeong, who scored only a single point. Because her opponent advanced further into the final for a gold medal match, Su qualified for the repechage bout, where she scored a single point and defeated New Zealand's Robin Cheong. In the bronze medal match, Su continued fighting despite falling to the mat for eleven times in visible pain, having suffered from a sustained foot injury, and being advised by her coach to stop. She tied with Croatia's Martina Zubčić for a score of 4–4 in the first three rounds, but lost a match by a decisive point in the fourth and final round. Su was carried from the mat by her coach, and was immediately taken to the hospital for treatment.

Su finished fifth in the women's taekwondo tournament, yet she was widely regarded as the nation's most outstanding athlete at the Olympics, lauded by fans and politicians for her fighting spirit and display of sportsmanship. President Ma Ying-jeou immediately called her to express his admiration of courage, fortitude, and perseverance she had demonstrated in the match.

References

External links

NBC 2008 Olympics profile

Taiwanese female taekwondo practitioners
1980 births
Living people
Olympic taekwondo practitioners of Taiwan
Taekwondo practitioners at the 2008 Summer Olympics
Asian Games medalists in taekwondo
Taekwondo practitioners at the 2002 Asian Games
Taekwondo practitioners at the 2006 Asian Games
Asian Games gold medalists for Chinese Taipei
Medalists at the 2006 Asian Games
Universiade medalists in taekwondo
Universiade gold medalists for Chinese Taipei
World Taekwondo Championships medalists
21st-century Taiwanese women